Baiami is a genus of Australian intertidal spiders that was first described by Pekka T. Lehtinen in 1967. Originally placed with the Stiphidiidae, it was transferred to the Desidae after the results of a 2019 genetic analysis.

Species
 it contains nine species, found in South Australia, Victoria, and Western Australia:
Baiami brockmani Gray, 1981 – Australia (Western Australia)
Baiami glenelgi Gray, 1981 – Australia (Victoria)
Baiami loftyensis Gray, 1981 – Australia (South Australia)
Baiami montana Gray, 1981 – Australia (Western Australia)
Baiami stirlingi Gray, 1981 – Australia (Western Australia)
Baiami storeniformis (Simon, 1908) – Australia (Western Australia)
Baiami tegenarioides (Simon, 1908) – Australia (Western Australia)
Baiami torbayensis Gray, 1981 – Australia (Western Australia)
Baiami volucripes (Simon, 1908) (type) – Australia (Western Australia)

B. longipes and B. magnus were transferred to Canala, and B. mullamullangensis was transferred to Tartarus.

See also
 List of Desidae species

References

Araneomorphae genera
Desidae
Spiders of Australia
Taxa named by Pekka T. Lehtinen